TransVolution is a privately owned rail transport business in Australia. TransVolution is an accredited rail transport operator in Victoria, New South Wales and South Australia.

History
TransVolution started out as a logistics consulting and transport equipment design business. It moved into rolling stock leasing and then rail operations with the acquisition of Masked Fox in 2014. TransVolution is yet to commence operating freight trains.

On 31 August 2015, TransVolution received accreditation from the National Rail Safety Regulator. As at 12 March 2020, TransVolution Operations Pty Ltd is accredited to operate rolling stock in Victoria, New South Wales and South Australia.

Fleet
TransVolution has the locomotive fleet set out in the below table. It purchased one 700 and two 830 class locomotives from Genesee & Wyoming Australia. These are believed to have been returned in 2018.

Owned

Leased

References

Freight railway companies of Australia
2013 establishments in Australia
Australian companies established in 2013